This is a list of electoral districts, or ridings, of Canada for the federal elections of 1968, 1972, and 1974. Electoral Districts are constituencies that elect Members of Parliament in Canada's House of Commons every election.

Newfoundland – 7 seats
Bonavista—Trinity—Conception
Burin—Burgeo
Gander—Twillingate
Grand Falls—White Bay—Labrador
Humber—St. George's—St. Barbe
St. John's East
St. John's West

Nova Scotia – 11 seats
Annapolis Valley
Cape Breton Highlands—Canso
Cape Breton—East Richmond
Cape Breton—The Sydneys
Central Nova
Cumberland—Colchester North
Dartmouth—Halifax East
Halifax
Halifax—East Hants
South Shore
South Western Nova

Prince Edward Island – 4 seats
Cardigan
Egmont
Hillsborough
Malpeque

New Brunswick – 10 seats
Carleton—Charlotte
Fundy—Royal
Gloucester
Madawaska—Victoria
Moncton
Northumberland—Miramichi
Restigouche
Saint John—Lancaster
Westmorland—Kent
York—Sunbury

Quebec – 74 seats

Abitibi
Ahuntsic
Argenteuil (renamed Argenteuil—Deux-Montagnes in 1970)
Beauce
Beauharnois (renamed Beauharnois—Salaberry in 1971)
Bellechasse
Berthier (renamed Berthier—Maskinongé in 1975)
Bonaventure (renamed Bonaventure—Îles-de-la-Madeleine in 1971)
Bourassa (renamed Montreal—Bourassa in 1971)
Chambly
Champlain
Charlevoix
Chicoutimi
Compton
Dollard
Drummond
Duvernay
Frontenac
Gamelin
Gaspé
Gatineau
Hochelaga
Hull
Joliette
Kamouraska
Labelle
Lac-Saint-Jean
Lachine (renamed Lachine—Lakeshore in 1973)
Lafontaine (renamed Lafontaine—Rosemont in 1975)
Langelier
Lapointe
Laprairie
Lasalle (renamed Lasalle—Émard—Côte Saint-Paul in 1973)
Laurier
Laval
Lévis
Longueuil
Lotbinière
Louis-Hébert
Maisonneuve (renamed Maisonneuve—Rosemont in 1970)
Manicouagan
Matane
Mercier
Missisquoi (renamed Brome—Missisquoi in 1970)
Montmorency
Mount Royal
Notre-Dame-de-Grâce
Outremont
Papineau
Pontiac
Portneuf
Québec-Est
Richelieu
Richmond
Rimouski
Roberval
Saint-Denis
Saint-Henri
Saint-Hyacinthe
Saint-Jacques
Saint-Jean
Saint-Maurice
Saint-Michel
Sainte-Marie
Shefford
Sherbrooke
Témiscamingue
Témiscouata (renamed Rivière-du-Loup—Témiscouata in 1972)
Terrebonne
Trois-Rivières (renamed Trois-Rivières Métropolitain in 1972)
Vaudreuil
Verdun
Villeneuve
Westmount

Ontario – 88 seats

Algoma
Brant
Broadview
Bruce (renamed Bruce—Grey in 1975)
Cochrane
Davenport
Don Valley
Eglinton
Elgin
Essex (renamed Essex—Windsor in 1972)
Etobicoke
Fort William
Frontenac—Lennox and Addington
Glengarry—Prescott (renamed Glengarry—Prescott—Russell in 1970)
Greenwood
Grenville—Carleton
Grey—Simcoe
Halton—Wentworth
Hamilton East
Hamilton Mountain
Hamilton West
Hamilton—Wentworth
Hastings
High Park (renamed High Park—Humber Valley in 1972)
Huron (renamed Huron—Middlesex in 1974)
Kenora—Rainy River
Kent—Essex
Kingston and the Islands
Kitchener
Lakeshore (renamed Toronto—Lakeshore in 1971)
Lambton—Kent
Lanark and Renfrew (renamed Lanark–Renfrew–Carleton in 1970)
Leeds
Lincoln
London East
London West
Middlesex (renamed Middlesex—London—Lambton in 1974)
Niagara Falls
Nickel Belt
Nipissing
Norfolk—Haldimand
Northumberland—Durham
Ontario
Oshawa—Whitby (Oshawa prior to 1967)
Ottawa Centre
Ottawa East (renamed Ottawa—Vanier in 1973)
Ottawa West
Ottawa—Carleton
Oxford
Parkdale
Parry Sound—Muskoka
Peel South (renamed Mississauga in 1973)
Peel—Dufferin—Simcoe (Peel—Dufferin prior to 1967)
Perth (renamed Perth—Wilmot in 1970)
Peterborough
Port Arthur
Prince Edward—Hastings
Renfrew North (renamed Renfrew North—Nipissing East in 1972)
Rosedale
Sarnia (renamed Sarnia—Lambton in 1970)
Sault Ste. Marie
Scarborough East
Scarborough West
Simcoe North
Spadina
St. Catharines
St. Paul's
Stormont—Dundas
Sudbury
Thunder Bay
Timiskaming
Timmins
Trinity
Victoria—Haliburton
Waterloo (renamed Waterloo—Cambridge in 1973)
Welland
Wellington
Wellington—Grey (renamed Wellington—Grey—Dufferin—Waterloo in 1970)
Windsor West
Windsor—Walkerville
York Centre
York East
York North
York South
York West
York—Scarborough
York—Simcoe

Manitoba – 13 seats
Brandon—Souris
Churchill
Dauphin
Lisgar
Marquette
Portage
Provencher
Selkirk
St. Boniface
Winnipeg North
Winnipeg North Centre
Winnipeg South
Winnipeg South Centre

Saskatchewan – 13 seats
Assiniboia
Battleford—Kindersley
Mackenzie
Meadow Lake
Moose Jaw
Prince Albert
Qu'Appelle—Moose Mountain
Regina East
Regina—Lake Centre
Saskatoon—Biggar
Saskatoon—Humboldt
Swift Current—Maple Creek
Yorkton—Melville

Alberta – 19 seats
Athabasca
Battle River
Calgary Centre
Calgary North
Calgary South
Crowfoot
Edmonton Centre
Edmonton East
Edmonton West
Edmonton—Strathcona
Lethbridge
Medicine Hat
Palliser
Peace River
Pembina
Red Deer
Rocky Mountain
Vegreville
Wetaskiwin

British Columbia – 23 seats
Burnaby—Richmond (renamed Burnaby—Richmond—Delta in 1970)
Burnaby—Seymour
Capilano
Coast Chilcotin
Comox—Alberni
Esquimalt—Saanich
Fraser Valley East
Fraser Valley West
Kamloops—Cariboo
Kootenay West
Nanaimo—Cowichan—The Islands
New Westminster
Okanagan Boundary
Okanagan—Kootenay
Prince George—Peace River
Skeena
Surrey (renamed Surrey—White Rock in 1971)
Vancouver Centre
Vancouver East
Vancouver Kingsway
Vancouver Quadra
Vancouver South
Victoria

Northwest Territories – 1 seat
Northwest Territories

Yukon – 1 seat
Yukon

1966-1976